Sue Mullen is an American politician, who was elected to the New Hampshire House of Representatives in the 2018 elections. She represents the Hillsborough 7th District as a member of the Democratic Party.

References

Living people
Democratic Party members of the New Hampshire House of Representatives
LGBT state legislators in New Hampshire
Women state legislators in New Hampshire
Lesbian politicians
21st-century American politicians
People from Bedford, New Hampshire
Year of birth missing (living people)
21st-century American women politicians